Anjali Patil is an Indian actress and film director who works in multiple languages. She has earned rave reviews for her work in Delhi in a Day, Chakravyuh, Newton and Sri Lankan film With You Without You. She received the IFFI Best Actor Award (Female) Silver Peacock Award at the 43rd International Film Festival of India her role in the Sri Lankan film With You Without You. In 2013, she starred in the Telugu film Na Bangaaru Talli for which she received the National Film Award – Special Mention, and the state Nandi Award for Best Actress.

Early life and education
Patil was born into a Marathi family and raised in Nashik, Maharashtra, India. Patil completed her higher school in Nashik. By age 14, she had decided to pursue performance art as her career. She persuaded her parents to send her to the Center for Performing Arts at University of Pune. In June 2007, she earned a bachelor's degree in arts with a gold medal for her excellence. Later that year, Patil was chosen to pursue Masters in Theater Design at National School of Drama in New Delhi. It presented her with many opportunities to work extensively with Indian and International film and theater actors and directors.

Career
Patil's first feature film opportunity came with Prashant Nair's Hindi-English international independent film Delhi in a Day. She was critically acclaimed for her portrayal of Rohini. The film premiered in Asia at the Mumbai film festival on 13 October 2011 and was released theatrically in India in August 2012.

In 2010–11, Patil worked as the lead actress and a producer on an international short film Green Bangles. It was selected as India's official entry to WIFTI (Women In Film and Television International, Los Angeles) and was eventually selected and screened at the WIFTI International Showcase 2012 in 44 cities in 15 countries.

She later on worked in Prakash Jha's film on issues related to Naxalism: Chakravyuh. Patil received rave reviews for her fierce portrayal of Naxal leader Juhi.

Oba Nathuwa Oba Ekka (With You, Without You) (2012) was her international collaboration with acclaimed Sri Lankan writer-director Prasanna Vithanage. Patil did the dubbing herself and that makes her the first Indian actress to dub in the Sinhala language. Her stellar performance won her Silver Peacock award for Best Actor Female at International Film Festival of India in Goa in November 2012. She is one of the youngest actors to receive this award. Patil also received the Presidential award Of Sri Lanka for her performance in 2017.

In 2016 Patil did her first Marathi film The Silence with Nagraj Manjule as a co-actor, for which she received a Filmfare award.

She played a pivotal role in Mirzya from Rakeysh Omprakash Mehra which was released in 2016. She went on to collaborate with him as the lead in Mere Pyare Prime Minister in 2018.

Patil's performance as Gondi speaking Malko- Adivasi BLO in Newton, with Rajkumar Rao in 2017 was highly applauded across all levels.

She played a bold and fierce activist, Puyal in Pa. Ranjith's Kaala with Rajinikanth earning a major following in Tamil industry.
Her next Tamil venture was Kuthirai Vaal which was screened at international film festivals.

Patil's latest work is  Hutatma a web series based on the Samyukta Maharashtra Samiti.
She recently received the prestigious Ma TA Sanmaan- Best actress  for her performance in this series.

Anjali has also worked in an ad film for Sintex, which urged people to take a pledge to save rivers.

Filmography

Films

Web series

Awards and nominations

References

External links

 
 

Living people
People from Nashik
Actresses from Maharashtra
Indian film actresses
Indian television actresses
Indian stage actresses
Actresses in Hindi cinema
Actresses in Kannada cinema
Actresses in Marathi cinema
Actresses in Tamil cinema
Actresses in Malayalam cinema
Actresses in Telugu cinema
Actresses in Hindi television
Actresses in Marathi television
Indian expatriates in Sri Lanka
Savitribai Phule Pune University alumni
National School of Drama alumni
IFFI Best Actor (Female) winners
Special Mention (feature film) National Film Award winners
Year of birth missing (living people)
21st-century Indian actresses